The Church of God in Christ (COGIC) is a Holiness-Pentecostal Christian denomination, with a predominantly African-American membership. The denomination reports having more than 12,000 churches and over 6.5 million members in the United States. The National Council of Churches ranks it as the fifth largest Christian denomination in the U.S. 

Internationally, COGIC can be found in more than 100 nations. Its worldwide membership is estimated to be between six and eight million, composing more than 25,000 congregations throughout the world. The following is a list of the geographical dioceses of the denomination, which are called "jurisdictions", and the leader of each.*

*TBD = To Be Determined – when the Office of Bishop is vacant for a diocese/jurisdiction in the case of the death, retirement, or abdication of a bishop, or if the jurisdiction is newly formed and has no bishop yet.

*Bishop-designate = A "Bishop-designate" or "Bishop-designee" is someone who has been selected to be a candidate for the Office of Bishop for a specific jurisdiction in the denomination, but has not yet been officially consecrated and installed in the position.

*Interim = This denotes that another bishop has been chosen from elsewhere in the denomination to be the temporary leader of a jurisdiction until a new Bishop-designate is officially consecrated and installed as its leader.

North America
*Updated as of March 9, 2023.*

Belize
 Belize Jurisdiction – Bishop Alber Oliver Quick
 Belize Second Jurisdiction - Bishop Anthony Richardson

Canada
 Nova Scotia Jurisdiction – Bishop Joe O. Wilkins, Sr.
 Canada/Michigan Jurisdiction – Bishop Percy W. Henderson
 British Columbia/Vancouver – Bishop Benjamin Stephens III
 Ontario Jurisdiction – Bishop Charles J. Johnson III

Mexico
 Mexico Jurisdiction - Bishop Maurice Green, Jr.

Panama
 Panama Jurisdiction – Bishop Eusebio Carlos Stewart

United States

Alabama
Alabama First Jurisdiction – Bishop Oscar L. Meadows
Alabama Second Jurisdiction – Bishop Marcus Earl Pulliam, Sr.
 Alabama Third Jurisdiction – Bishop Peter Wren, Sr.

Alaska
Alaska Jurisdiction – Bishop Otis McCormick

Arizona
 Arizona Jurisdiction – Bishop Harvey T. Young, Sr.

Arkansas
Arkansas First Jurisdiction – Bishop Jewel R. Withers, Jr
Arkansas Second Jurisdiction – Bishop Frank J. Anderson, Jr.
 Arkansas Third  Jurisdiction – Bishop Michael A. Jones

 Arkansas Fourth Jurisdiction – Bishop Junius Earl Williams
 Arkansas Fifth Jurisdiction – Bishop Lee Beard lll

California
 California New Journey – Bishop John M. Richardson, Sr.
 California North Central – Bishop Donald R. Murray 
 California Northwest – Bishop Nathaniel Bullock
 California Greater Northern Second – Bishop Johnathan Douglas Logan, Sr. 
 California Nor Cal Metropolitan – Bishop Jerry Wayne Macklin, First Assistant Presiding Bishop, General Board Member
 California Northern First – Bishop Albert Galbraith, Chairman, Board of Bishops
 California Northeast – Bishop Michael Julian Johnson
 California Southern First – Bishop Joe L. Ealy
 California Southern Evangelistic – Bishop Christopher Edwin Milton
 California Southern Second – Bishop Charles G. Nauden
 California Southern Third – Bishop Roger Thomas
 California Southern Fourth – Bishop Roy Dixon
 California Southern Metropolitan – Bishop J. Bernard Hackworth
 California Southwest – Bishop Hillrie Murphy
 California West Coast – Bishop Robert "Bob" Jackson
 California Western – Bishop Leo Smith
 California Valley – Bishop Samuel L. Doyle

Colorado
 Colorado Jurisdiction – Bishop Wayne H. McDonald

Connecticut
 Connecticut First Jurisdiction – Bishop Charles H. Brewer III
 Connecticut Second Jurisdiction – Bishop Augustus D. Pullen
 Connecticut Third/Southern New England Jurisdiction – Bishop T. Walter Plummer

Delaware
 Delaware Jurisdiction – Bishop Thomas L. Holsey

District of Columbia
 Washington, D.C. Jurisdiction – Bishop Neavelle A. Coles

Florida
Florida Central First Jurisdiction – Bishop Gary L. Hall, Sr.
 Florida Central Second Jurisdiction – Bishop Edward Robinson, Sr.
 Florida Eastern – Bishop Jimmie Lee Williams
 Florida Northwest – Bishop Willie C. Green
 Florida Southern – Bishop Julian C. Jackson
 Florida Southwest – Bishop Anthony W. Gilyard 
 Florida Western – Bishop Willie J. Matheney
 Florida Western Second – Bishop Larry Perkins

Georgia
 Georgia North Central – Bishop Joseph E. Hogan Sr.
 Georgia Northern First – Bishop Leonard J. Chapple, Sr. 
 Georgia Northern Second – Bishop Mark Walden
 Georgia South Central – Bishop Norman O. Harper
 Georgia Southeast – Bishop Benjamin P. Collins 
 Georgia Southern First – Bishop Larry L. Shaw
 Georgia Southern Second – Bishop Ronald Engram
 Western Georgia – Bishop John F. Thomas 
 Georgia Metro – Bishop Michael J. Paden, Sr.

Hawaii
 Hawaii State Jurisdiction – Bishop Jesse T. Wilson, Sr.

Idaho
 Idaho Jurisdiction – Bishop Taro D. Golden

Illinois
 Illinois First – Bishop Ocie Booker
 Illinois Third – Bishop Roland "Terry" Sanders
 Illinois Fifth East – Bishop James C. Austin
 Illinois Sixth – Bishop Clowdell Williams, Sr.
 Illinois Central – Bishop Andrei V. Newbon
 Illinois Seventh – Bishop R.D. Edward Goodwin, Sr.
 Illinois Midwest – Bishop Darrell L. Hines, General Board Member
 Illinois Southeast – Bishop Otis A. Eanes Sr.  
 Historic Northern Illinois – Bishop Edwin Walker
 Illinois Southern – Bishop Embra Patterson
 Illinois Fifth West – Bishop James E. Washington

Indiana
 Historic Indiana First – Bishop Carl J. Steen, Jr.
 Indiana Second – Bishop Benjamin A. Sanders
 Indiana Third – Bishop E. Bobby Warren
 Indiana North Central Fourth – Bishop Donald Alford Sr.

Iowa
 Iowa Jurisdiction – Bishop Leroy Johnson

Kansas
 Kansas Central – Bishop Milton Paul Jackson, Jr.
 Kansas East – Bishop Lemuel F. Thuston – Chairman of the General Assembly COGIC
 Kansas Southwest – Bishop Mark LaVoy Gilkey

Kentucky
 Kentucky First – Bishop John W. Fleming 
 Kentucky Second – Bishop James Bell Sr.

Louisiana
 Louisiana First – Bishop James Proctor 
 Louisiana East First – Bishop Alphonso Denson, Sr.
 Louisiana East Second – Bishop Gerald Hastings Hawkins, Sr.
 Louisiana East Third – Bishop Howard E. Quillen, Jr.
 Louisiana Greater New Orleans – Bishop Charles E. Brown, Sr.
 Louisiana South Central – Bishop Willie Cage

Maine
 Maine Jurisdiction – Bishop Steve Coleman

Maryland
 Maryland Central Jurisdiction  – Bishop Carl A. Pierce, Sr.
 Maryland Eastern Shore – Bishop Paul Harmon
 Greater Maryland First – Bishop Joel H. Lyles, Jr., General Secretary

Massachusetts
 Massachusetts First – Bishop Samuel Byron Hogan Sr.
 Massachusetts Greater Jurisdiction – Bishop Bryant Robinson Jr.

Michigan
 Canadian-Michigan Jurisdiction – Bishop Percy W. Henderson 
 Michigan Great Lakes First – Bishop Michael E. Hill, General Board Member
 Michigan Great Lakes Second – Bishop Dwight Walls, Chairman, Trustee Board
 Michigan North Central – Bishop J. Drew Sheard, Presiding Bishop of the Church Of God In Christ, General Board Member 
 Michigan Northeast – Bishop Zachary N. Hicks
 Michigan Southeast – Bishop Roger L. Jones, Sr. - Vice Chairman, Board Of Bishops
 Michigan Southwest Agape – Bishop Michael E. Hill (Interim) 
 Michigan Southwest First – Bishop Marcus R. Ways
 Michigan Southwest Second – Vacant, TBD (Bishop James Whitehead – Deceased as of March 8, 2023)
 Michigan Southwest Third Jurisdiction – Bishop Samuel Duncan, Jr.
 Michigan Southwest Fourth Jurisdiction – Bishop Aaron Milton, Sr.
 Michigan Southwest Fifth – Bishop Don W. Shelby, Jr.
 Michigan Western – Bishop Melvin C. Burton
 Michigan Western Second Jurisdiction – Bishop James E. Atterberry, Sr.

Minnesota
 Minnesota Jurisdiction – Bishop Fred Willis Washington

Mississippi
 Mississippi Northern – Bishop William Dean, Jr.
 Mississippi Southern First – Bishop Daniel Littleton
 Mississippi Southern Second – Bishop Kenneth E. Preston

Missouri
 Eastern Missouri First – BIshop Lawrence M. Wooten (Interim)
 Eastern Missouri Second Western Illinois – Bishop Lawrence M. Wooten, Second Assistant Presiding Bishop, General Board Member
Eastern Missouri Third -  Bishop Robert D. Strong
 Missouri Southeastern Third – Bishop Nathaniel Ellis
 Missouri Western First – Bishop Frank Douglas 
 Missouri Western Second – Bishop John M. Johnson
 Missouri Midwest – Bishop Elijah H. Hankerson III, General Board Member
 Missouri Gateway - Bishop Melvin J. Smith, Vice Chairman of the General Assembly

Montana
 Montana Jurisdiction – Bishop Marcus L. Collins

Nebraska
 Nebraska First Jurisdiction – Bishop John O. Ford
 Eastern Nebraska Jurisdiction – Bishop Joseph L. Shannon, Sr.

Nevada
 Nevada First Jurisdiction – Bishop Leon Smith
 Northern Nevada First Jurisdiction – Bishop Luther Dupree

New Hampshire
Greater New Hampshire Jurisdiction – Bishop Robert L Webbs, Sr.

New Jersey
 New Jersey First – Bishop Martin L. Johnson, Sr., Chairman, International Judiciary Board
 New Jersey Garden State – Bishop William T. Cahoon
 New Jersey Third – Bishop Kevin E. Knight, Sr.
 New Jersey South Jersey – Bishop Tyrone McCombs

New Mexico
 New Mexico Jurisdiction – Bishop James L'Keith Jones.

New York
 New York Eastern First – Bishop James  Pullings Jr. 
 New York Eastern Second – Bishop Rothel Highsmith
 New York Eastern Third – Bishop Frank A. White, Financial Secretary
 New York Eastern Fourth – Bishop Clarence L. Sexton, Jr.
 New York Eastern Fifth – Bishop Harrison Hale
 New York Southeast – Bishop Tyrone L. Butler
 New York Central – Bishop R.J. Hoston
 New York Western First – Bishop James R. Wright, Sr.
 New York Western Second – Bishop Glenwood Young

North Carolina
 North Carolina Greater – Bishop LeRoy Jackson Woolard 
 North Carolina Second – Bishop Stenneth E. Powell, Sr.
 North Carolina Third – Bishop Patrick L. Wooden, Sr., Vice President of International Men's Department

North Dakota
 North Dakota Jurisdiction – Bishop Michael R. Cole.

Ohio
 Ohio Central East – Bishop David L. Herron, Sr.
 Ohio North First – Bishop Edward T. Cook
 Ohio Northwest – Bishop Clifford L. Kimbrough, Jr.
 Ohio Southern – Bishop George L. Carter
 Ohio West – Bishop Emmitt L. Nevels, Sr.

Oklahoma
 Oklahoma Northwest – Bishop Lee V. Broom
 Oklahoma Southeast – Bishop Malcolm W. Coby, General Board Member

Oregon
 Oregon First – Bishop Archie R. Hopkins, Sr.
 Oregon Second – Bishop Percy J. Mullen

Pennsylvania
 Commonwealth of Pennsylvania – Bishop Guy L. Glimp
 Pennsylvania Central – Bishop Edgar L. Scott
 Pennsylvania Eastern – Bishop David Morrell Screven
 Pennsylvania Western First – Bishop Marvin C. Moreland II (Bishop James Miles Foster – Emeritus)
 Pennsylvania Western Second – Bishop Melvin E. Clark Sr.
 Pennsylvania Keystone – Bishop Vernon Prioleau
 Pennsylvania Koinonia – Bishop Ernest Carl Morris

Rhode Island
 Rhode Island Jurisdiction – Bishop Elijah Hankerson (Interim)

South Carolina
South Carolina Jurisdiction – Bishop William A. Prioleau

South Dakota
 South Dakota Jurisdiction – Bishop Troy M. Carr

Tennessee
 Tennessee Central – Bishop Brandon B. Porter, General Board Member
 Tennessee Eastern First – Bishop Felton M. Smith Jr.
 Tennessee Eastern Second – Bishop Willie L. Bonner
Tennessee Fourth – Bishop Jerry Maynard
 Tennessee Fifth – Bishop Jerry Wayne Taylor
 Tennessee Headquarters – Bishop David A. Hall Sr., General Board Member
 Tennessee Southwest – Bishop William S. Wright Sr.
 Tennessee Metropolitan – Bishop Linwood Dillard, Jr., Chairman of the International AIM Convention

Texas

 Texas Central Metropolitan – Bishop Frank Fanniel Sr.
 Texas Covenant Jurisdiction - Bishop Gilbert Isaiah Gillum Jr.
 Texas East – Bishop Robert L. Nichols Sr.
 Texas Greater Southeast First – Bishop Johnny A. Tates
 Texas Gulf Coast – Bishop Destry C. Bell
 Texas Lone Star Jurisdiction – Bishop Don Venson Nobles Sr.
 Texas Metropolitan – Bishop Reginald L. Williams
 Texas North Central – Bishop Robert L. Sample 
 Texas Northeast First – Bishop James E. Hornsby 
 Texas Northeast Second – Bishop David R. Houston
 Texas Northeast Third – Bishop  Nelson J. Gatlin 
 Texas Northeast Fourth – Bishop Nathiel D. Wells   
 Texas Northwest – Bishop William H. Watson, III
 Texas South Central – Bishop Prince E. W. Bryant, Sr., General Board Member
 Texas Southeast First – Bishop Kurt L. Thompson
 Texas Southeast Second – Bishop Ladell Thomas Jr.
 Texas Southeast Third – Bishop Travis T. Terry
 Texas Southwest First – Bishop Maurice Green Jr. 
 Texas Southwest Second – Bishop Shelton C. Rhodes 
 Texas Western – Bishop Juan O. Lawson

Utah
 Utah Jurisdiction – Bishop Bobby R. Allen

Vermont
 Vermont Ecclesiastical Jurisdiction – Bishop Talbert W. Swan, II, Assistant General Secretary

Virginia
 Virginia First – Bishop Marc A. Thomas, Sr. 
 Virginia Second – Bishop Michael B. Golden, Jr., President of International Men's Department (Interim until officially appointed and installed in 2023)/Bishop J. Drew Sheard (Interim)
 Virginia Third – Bishop Prince E. W. Bryant, Sr., (Interim)
 Virginia Fourth – Bishop G. Wesley Hardy Sr.
 Virginia Grace Fifth – Bishop Dwight L. Green, Sr.

Washington
 Washington State First Jurisdiction – Bishop Alvin C. Moore, Sr.
 Washington Northwest Jurisdiction – Bishop Reginald C. Witherspoon

West Virginia
 Greater West Virginia Jurisdiction – Bishop Clyde D. Brown

Wisconsin
 Wisconsin First Jurisdiction – Bishop Sedgwick Daniels,  General Board Member
 Wisconsin Northwest – Bishop Charles H. McClelland, General Board Member

Wyoming
 Wyoming Jurisdiction – Bishop Willie Harris

Caribbean

Anguilla 

 Rehoboth Caribbean Jurisdiction – Bishop Robert G. Rudolph, Jr.

Bahamas
 Bahamas Jurisdiction – Bishop Tony L. Hanna

Barbados
 Barbados/Caribbean Jurisdiction – Bishop Paul L. Fortson
 Barbados First - Bishop Arthur F. Mosley

Bermuda
 Bermuda Jurisdiction – Bishop Richard White Sr.

Costa Rica
 Costa Rica Jurisdiction - Bishop Harry Beard

Cuba
Cuba Jurisdiction – Bishop Jose Mesa Videaux

Dominican Republic
 Dominican Republic First Jurisdiction – Bishop Ron Gibson
 Dominican Republic Second Jurisdiction – Bishop Joseph J. Mayo

El Salvador
 El Salvador Jurisdiction - Bishop Herbert R Davis

Guatemala
 Guatemala Jurisdiction – Bishop Charles H. Mason Patterson, Sr., General Treasurer

Haiti
 Haiti Jurisdiction - Bishop Leon Pamphile

Jamaica
 Jamaica Jurisdiction – Bishop Harold Haughton
 Greater Jamaica (Second) Jurisdiction – Bishop Joseph A. Chase Jr.

Puerto Rico  

 Commonwealth of Puerto Rico – Bishop Elton J. Amos Sr.

Saint Lucia 
 Saint Lucia Eastern Caribbean Jurisdiction - Bishop E. Charles Connor

Saint Croix 
 Saint Croix Jurisdiction – Bishop Alan G. Porter

Saint Kitts and Nevis 
 Saint Kitts and Nevis Ecclesiastical Jurisdiction – Bishop Vincent Matthews (Interim)

Saint Thomas 
 Saint Thomas Ecclesiastical Jurisdiction - Bishop Ahmed M. Screven, Esq.

Trinidad and Tobago
 Trinidad and Tobago First Jurisdiction – Bishop Alton Gatlin
 Trinidad & Tobago Second Jurisdiction – Bishop Joseph H.Griffith

Turks and Caicos
 Turks and Caicos Jurisdiction - Bishop Earl J Wright Jr.

Africa

Angola
 Angola First - Bishop Macano Kamuimba Marcos Pedro

Democratic Republic of the Congo

 Congo First Jurisdiction  – Bishop Muhangenu H. Ghilain
Congo Second Jurisdiction - Bishop Matthew L Brown

Ethiopia
Ethiopia Jurisdiction – Bishop Corby Bush

Gambia
 Gambia/West Africa Jurisdiction - Bishop Lorenzo D. Lee

Ghana
 Republic of Ghana Jurisdiction – Bishop Emmanuel A. Boateng
 Ghana West Africa Jurisdiction - Bishop Emmanuel Kofi Anim

Kenya
 Kenya, East Africa First Jurisdiction – Bishop Jerry L. Ivery Sr.
 Kenya, Cornerstone First Jurisdiction – Bishop Francis Kamau
 Kenya, Impact Third Jurisdiction - Bishop Solomon Omo-Osagie

Liberia
 Liberia Jurisdiction – Bishop Francis Stewart

Malawi
 Malawi Central Jurisdiction – Bishop Ronald Sabawo
 Malawi Second Jurisdiction – Bishop Chifundo Mwanandi

Nigeria
 Nigeria First Jurisdiction – Bishop Joseph O. Oipinejaro
 Nigeria Southern Jurisdiction – Bishop Henry Chikwudi
 Nigeria West Africa Jurisdiction – Bishop Lucky C. Donuwe
 Nigeria God is REAL Jurisdiction - Bishop Friday U Okwey.
 Nigeria Pinnacle Faith Jurisdiction - Bishop Dr Louis O Morah.
 Nigeria PURITY Jurisdiction - Bishop Newlife Ugochukwu 
 Nigeria Eastern Gateway - Bishop Onuigwe Emeka Dominic
 Sanctuary of Peace Ecclesiastical Jurisdiction - Bishop Bolu Fam
 Nigeria United Ecclesiastical Jurisdiction - Bishop Micaiah J. Young, Sr.

Ivory Coast
 West Ivory Coast Jurisdiction – Bishop Enoch Perry

Rwanda
 East African Rwandan Jurisdiction -- Bishop Jeffrey Melvin

South Africa
 South Africa – Bishop Vincent Mathews, International Missions President
 South Africa Second – Bishop Vincent Mathews (Interim)
 South Africa Third – Bishop Vincent Mathews (Interim)
 South Africa Fourth - Bishop Wayne Janecke
 South Africa Fifth – Bishop Ben Zulu
 South Africa Seventh – Bishop W. Johnny McNair Jr.

Togo 
 Togo - Bishop Archie Hopkins, Jr.

Sri Lanka
 Sri Lanka First - Bishop Blessing Titus Fernando

Uganda
 East African Ugandan Jurisdiction – Bishop Bobby Henderson

Zambia
 Zambia First – Bishop Ngamitu Muhini  
 Zambia Second - Bishop Justine Gondwe

Asia

Philippines
 Philippines Jurisdiction – Bishop Avel Forto, Sr
 Philippines Second Jurisdiction - Bishop Avel Forto, Jr
 Northern Luzon Philippines Jurisdiction - Bishop Joel F. Balindan, Sr.
 Philippines Northern Mindanan Jurisdiction - Bishop Bob Steele
 Philippines Central Luzon Jurisdiction - Bishop Israel Forto

India
 India First Jurisdiction – Bishop Dr. Bevin G. Lawrence
 India Second Jurisdiction – Bishop Samram Paul
 India Third Jurisdiction – Bishop Edison Victor
 India Fourth Jurisdiction – Bishop Joseph Norfleet
 India Fifth Jurisdiction – Bishop G. Jeyakumar
 India Sixth Jurisdiction - Bishop Oscar Benton

Israel
 Israel Jurisdiction - Bishop Glenn Plummer

Pakistan
 Pakistan Jurisdiction – Bishop George Adebanjo

South Korea
 South Korea Jurisdiction - Bishop Chadwick F. Carlton

Sri Lanka
 Sri Lanka First - Bishop Blessing Titus Fernando

UAE Dubai
 UAE Dubai Jurisdiction - Bishop Amere May, Sr.

South America

Argentina
 Argentina Jurisdiction – Bishop Vincent Matthews (Interim)
 Argentina 2nd Jurisdiction- Bishop Ron C. Hill

Brazil
 Brazil Jurisdiction – Bishop Terence Rhone

Chile
 Chile Jurisdiction - Bishop Gabriel McCurtis

Colombia
 Colombia 1st Jurisdiction - Bishop Lester Johnson
 Colombia 2nd Jurisdiction - Bishop Edermin Cortes

Guyana
 Guyana Jurisdiction – Bishop Curtis B. Sexton

Peru

Republic of Peru Jurisdiction - Bishop Morris O. Jenkins, Jr.

Venezuela
Venezuela Jurisdiction – Bishop Warren C. Dorris

Europe

France 

 France Jurisdiction –  Bishop Vincent Matthews (Interim)

Germany
Germany Jurisdiction – Bishop Paul L. Watson

Greece
 Greece Jurisdiction –  Bishop Vincent Matthews (Interim)

Spain 

 Spain Jurisdiction – Bishop Edwin C. Bass

United Kingdom
United Kingdom Jurisdiction – Bishop Alvin Blake

Portugal
 Portugal Jurisdiction –  Bishop Naté M. Jefferson

Oceania

Indonesia
Indonesia – Bishop Vincent Matthews (Interim)

Papua New Guinea
Papua New Guinea – Bishop Vincent Matthews (Interim)

New Zealand
New Zealand – Superintendent Tyrone Scafe, Missions Director

See also
 Church of God in Christ, Inc.

References 

Church of God in Christ